The Primera División A Clausura 2009 is a Mexican football tournament, the second of two short tournaments held during the 2008–2009 Mexican football season. It began on January 10, 2009 and will run until May 23 or May 24, 2009. The winner of the tournament will earn a place in the promotional playoff against Querétaro, the winners of the Apertura 2008 tournament, to determine which team will be promoted to the Primera División.

Tournament format

A total of 27 teams are divided into three groups of nine teams each. Each team plays the other eight teams in its group twice, once at home and once away, for a total of 16 games. At the end of the regular season the top two teams in each group, as well as the next two highest placed teams, qualify to the Liguilla (playoffs). The teams are seeded based on their position in the general table and are arranged before each round so that the highest seeded team remaining always plays the lowest seed remaining. The teams play a home and away series and whichever team has the better aggregate score advances. If the two teams are tied after both legs in the quarterfinals and semifinals the higher seed advances automatically. In the finals, if the two teams are tied after both legs two 15 minute halves of extra time are added. If the teams are still tied after extra time the champion is determined through a penalty shootout.

Promotion

One team is promoted to the Primera División each year (two short tournaments). After the Clausura 2009 tournament, the champions of the Apertura 2008 and Clausura 2009 tournaments will play a home and home series to determine which team will be promoted. If the same team wins both tournaments it will be promoted automatically. In order for a team to be promoted it has to obtain a certification from the Federación Mexicana de Fútbol Asociación. If the winner of the promotional final is not certified for promotion a home and away series is played between the highest placed certified team and the club being relegated to the Primera División A to determine which will be in the Primera División.

Currently certified teams

 Atlético Mexiquense
 BUAP
 Cruz Azul
 Durango
 Irapuato
 Mérida
 León
 Querétaro
 Santos Laguna
 Sinaloa
 Tijuana
 UAT
 Veracruz

Relegation

One team is relegated to the Segunda División each year (two short tournaments). The team that has the worst points to games played ratio over the previous three years (Apertura 2006, Clausura 2007, Apertura 2007, Clausura 2008, Apertura 2008, Clausura 2009) is relegated to the Segunda División.

Group league tables

Group 1

Group 2

Group 3

General league table

Liguilla

Promotional Final

First Leg

Second leg

Results

Group 1

Group 2

Group 3

Top scorers

As of: May 4, 2009Source: FMF

Relegation table

External links
Federación Mexicana de Fútbol Asociación, A. C.

2008–09 in Mexican football
2009 domestic association football leagues
Ascenso MX seasons